Langwith-Whaley Thorns railway station is in Derbyshire, England. The station is on the Robin Hood Line 22¼ miles (36 km) north of Nottingham towards Worksop.

This station serves the villages of Nether Langwith and Whaley Thorns which are both on the boundary of Derbyshire and Nottinghamshire. It also serves the village of Langwith in Derbyshire.

The Robin Hood Line was opened to reinstate a Nottingham to Worksop service, which ran from 1875 until it was withdrawn in October 1964. After withdrawal the station at Langwith was razed to the ground. When the Robin Hood service was being planned it was decided that, rather than build a new station on the original site in Langwith Maltings, the community would be better served by building the new station about half a mile further North in the larger communities of Nether Langwith and Whaley Thorns. The "old" Langwith station is described at Langwith station (1875-1964).

Services
All services at Langwith-Whaley Thorns are operated by East Midlands Railway.

There is currently no Sunday service at the station since the previous service of four trains per day was withdrawn in 2011. Sunday services at the station are due to recommence at the station during the life of the East Midlands franchise.

References

External links

Railway stations in Derbyshire
DfT Category F2 stations
Railway stations opened by Railtrack
Railway stations in Great Britain opened in 1998
Railway stations served by East Midlands Railway